Nimbougou is a village and rural commune in the Cercle of Kadiolo in the Sikasso Region of southern Mali. The commune covers an area of 238 square kilometers and includes 5 villages. In the 2009 census it had a population of 9,992. The village of Nimbougou, the administrative center (chef-lieu) of the commune, is 43 km northeast of Kadiolo and 8 km from the border with Burkina Faso The primary language is Senufo, specifically Suppire.

References

External links
.

Communes of Sikasso Region